Pencil Code is an educational programming language and website.  It allows programming using either Scratch-style block coding, or CoffeeScript.  Code runs directly in the web browser and can be shared with others.  The language centers on a model of a pencil programmatically drawing on a 2-dimensional screen, with the pencil cursor depicted visually as a turtle.

History 
Pencil Code was created by David Bau and his son in 2013.  It was inspired by Logo, the 1967 programming language for drawing on a screen using a Lisp-like programming language.  Google has funded improvements to Pencil Code via Google Summer of Code projects.

References

External links 
 Pencil Code official website

Domain-specific programming languages
Educational programming languages
Free educational software
Programming languages